Vladimir Olegovich Gogberashvili (born 16 April 1987) is a Russian professional football official and a former player. He is currently the sporting director of FC Mashuk-KMV Pyatigorsk.

Club career
He made his Russian Football National League debut for FC Mashuk-KMV Pyatigorsk on 5 April 2006 in a game against FC Fakel Voronezh.

Management career
At the end of the 2018-19 season, Gogberashvili decided to retire. He was hired as a sporting director ahead of the 2019-20 season for his former club FC Mashuk-KMV Pyatigorsk.

Personal life
His twin brother Otar Gogberashvili is also a professional footballer.

References

External links
 

1987 births
Sportspeople from Kutaisi
Living people
Russian footballers
FC Dynamo Moscow reserves players
Russian twins
FC Luch Vladivostok players
Russian expatriate footballers
Expatriate footballers in Lithuania
FC Khimki players
FC Chernomorets Novorossiysk players
Twin sportspeople
FC Orenburg players
FC Tyumen players
Association football midfielders
FC Kolkheti-1913 Poti players
Expatriate footballers in Georgia (country)
FC Nizhny Novgorod (2015) players
FC Mashuk-KMV Pyatigorsk players